Hidde Jurjus (born 9 February 1994) is a Dutch professional footballer who plays as a goalkeeper for Eerste Divisie club De Graafschap.

Club career
On 27 August 2020, he signed a two-year contract with the German club KFC Uerdingen 05.

Jurjus returned to De Graafschap on 4 June 2021, signing a two-year contract with his childhood club.

References

External links
 
 Voetbal International profile 
 
 

1994 births
Living people
Footballers from Oost Gelre
Association football goalkeepers
Dutch footballers
Netherlands under-21 international footballers
De Graafschap players
Jong PSV players
Roda JC Kerkrade players
KFC Uerdingen 05 players
Eredivisie players
Eerste Divisie players
People from Lichtenvoorde
Dutch expatriate footballers
Expatriate footballers in Germany
Dutch expatriate sportspeople in Germany